The Tanzania Intelligence and Security Service (TISS) is the national intelligence and security agency of Tanzania.

The Agency works closely with other National and International intelligence agencies and securities  organs in the promotion and maintenance of peace, safety and security in and outside Tanzania’s  borders.

References

Intelligence agencies
Government agencies of Tanzania